This is a list of opinion polls taken on the presidency of Joe Biden in 2021. To navigate between years, see opinion polling on the Joe Biden administration. For 2022 opinion polling, see 2022 opinion polling on the Joe Biden administration.

Biden's average approval rating was generally over 50% in the first 7 months of his presidency. In late July, his approval rating started to decline. With the fall of Kabul in mid-August and a majority of Americans disapproving of Biden's handling of the withdrawal from Afghanistan, as well as the continued rise in COVID-19 cases, his average disapproval rating became higher than his average approval rating in late August. Biden started having an average disapproval rating of over 50% in late October. By then, Afghanistan had largely faded from the news, leading some to believe the COVID-19 pandemic, worsened by the Delta variant, and the polarization regarding measures like vaccine mandates, caused his low approval rating. Others have emphasized that the high inflation, which hit a 39-year high, negatively affected his approval rating.

Job approval ratings 

The graph below shows the average of the aggregate polls listed below.

2021 
Poll numbers verified .

January

February

March

April

May

June

July

August

September

October

November

December

References 

2021 in American politics
Presidency of Joe Biden
Opinion polling in the United States